Aura Eternal is the stage name of Alan Yuri Geraci, an Italian drag performer who has competed on the second season of Drag Race Italia as well as the second season of Queen of the Universe.

Career 
Aura Eternal completed on the second season of Drag Race Italia, placing in the top three. She is inspired by divas and supermodels from the 1990s such as Mariah Carey and Linda Evangelista. According to Out, "The message Aura Eternal wants to communicate to her audience is one of free love without prejudice; the hunger for freedom; and the desire to be whoever you want, always and in any case."

Personal life 
Geraci is based in Palermo, as of 2023.

Filmography

Television

References

External links
 Aura Eternal at IMDb

1990s births
Living people
Drag Race Italia contestants
Italian drag queens
People from Palermo
Queen of the Universe contestants